This is a list of the main career statistics of the Kazakh professional tennis player Yulia Putintseva. Putintseva has won two WTA singles titles, the 2019 Nuremberg Cup and the 2021 Budapest Grand Prix. She has reached three Grand Slam quarter-finals, two of them at the French Open (2016 and 2018) and one at the US Open (2020). She has also reached one Premier 5 quarter-final, at the 2020 Italian Open. Putintseva achieved her highest singles ranking of world No. 27 on 6 February 2017.

Performance timelines 

Only main-draw results in WTA Tour, Grand Slam tournaments, Fed Cup/Billie Jean King Cup and Olympic Games are included in win–loss records.

Singles
Current after the 2023 Indian Wells Open.

Doubles

WTA career finals
Putintseva debuted at the WTA Tour in October 2010 at the Luxembourg Open in singles. Since then, she reached two International and one Premier-level tournaments, all in singles, winning only one of them, international-level Nuremberg Cup in May 2019.

Singles: 5 (2 titles, 3 runner–ups)

ITF Circuit finals
Putintseva debuted at the ITF Women's World Tennis Tour in 2010 at the $10K event in Amiens in singles. She has been in twelve finals and won half of them, while in doubles she has not reached any final. Her biggest title on the ITF Circuit was in May 2012, at the $100k Open de Cagnes-sur-Mer.

Singles: 12 (6 titles, 6 runner–ups)

WTA Tour career earnings
Current through the 2022 Indian Wells Open

Career Grand Slam statistics

Grand Slam tournament seedings 
The tournaments won by Putintseva are in boldface, and advanced into finals by Putintseva are in italics.

Best Grand Slam results details

Record against other players

Record against top 10 players 
Putintseva's record against players who have been ranked in the top 10. Active players are in boldface.

No. 1 wins

Top 10 wins
Putintseva has a  record against players who were, at the time the match was played, ranked in the top 10.

*

Notes

References

Putintseva, Yulia